Yadamsürengiin Tuyaa (born 6 November 1947) is a retired Mongolian gymnast. She competed at the 1964 and 1968 Summer Olympics in all individual artistic gymnastics events. Her greatest athletic achievement was placing in 48th on the balance beam at 1968 Olympics.

References

1947 births
Living people
Sportspeople from Ulaanbaatar
Gymnasts at the 1964 Summer Olympics
Gymnasts at the 1968 Summer Olympics
Olympic gymnasts of Mongolia
Mongolian female artistic gymnasts
20th-century Mongolian women